The 1896 United States presidential election in South Carolina took place on November 3, 1896. Voters chose 9 representatives, or electors to the Electoral College, who voted for president and vice president.

South Carolina overwhelmingly voted for the Democratic nominee, former U.S. Representative from Nebraska William Jennings Bryan, over the Republican nominee, former governor of Ohio William McKinley. Bryan won the state by a landslide margin of 71.79%. However, McKinley's performance would actually prove to be a high water mark for Republicans going into the 20th century; he was the last Republican to win even 10% of the state's vote until Dwight D. Eisenhower in 1952.

Results

Results by county

Notes

References

South Carolina
1896
1896 South Carolina elections